Nesreen AbdElrhman Tafesh (born February 15, 1982) is a Syrian-Palestinian-Algerian actress and singer.

Early life
Nesreen was born in Aleppo, Syria to the Palestinian poet and author Yousef Tafesh from the Palestinian town of Safed and an Algerian mother from Oran in Algeria. She has seven female siblings. Nesreen's mother was born from a Moroccan Amazigh mother from Tafilalt. 

She graduated from the Higher Institute for Dramatic Arts in Damascus in 2008. Nesreen is considered a Syrian actress, yet she only has Algerian nationality.

Career
Nesreen's first act ever was in a biography series about Hulagu Khan when she was still studying at the Higher Institute for Dramatic Arts. Afterward, she worked in the series, playing the lead female role of Subh, wife of Caliph Al-Hakam II. The work was written by Walid Saif. In 2017, she started singing by releasing singles "Metghayar Alayi".

She used to live in Dubai, United Arab Emirates, before she moved to Egypt in late 2018, in which she acted in the film.

Personal life
While still in college, she was briefly engaged to the Syrian movie and TV director of Palestinian origin, Al-Mothanna Sobah. She was married to an Emirati businessman from 2008 to 2013. In 2017, she took 79th place on the list of 100 Most Beautiful Faces. In July 2022, she announced her marriage with Egyptian dentist Sherif Sharkawy; however, the marriage only lasted for five months.

Filmography

TV Series
 Hulagu (2002)
 Rabea Cordoba (Córdoba's Spring) (2003)
 al-Taghreba al-Falastenya (The Palestinian alienation) (2004)
 Rijal taht altarbush (Men under Tarboosh) (2004)
 Ahlam Kabira (Big Dreams) (2004)
 Ala Tool al-Ayam (Along the days) (2006)
 Al Intizar (Waiting) (2006)
 Ahl al-Gharam (People of love) (2006)
 Sabaya (2009)
 Fengan El Dam (A cup of blood) (2009)
 Bok'et Dao'e (Spotlight) (2010)
 Alsarab (The mirage) (2011)
 Jalasat Nisa'iya (Women's sessions) (2011)
 Banat El-Aela (Family girls) (2012)
 Tahaluf alsabar (Cactus Alliance) (2014)
 Halawet Elrouh (Soul's sweetness) (2014)
 Fee Zoroof Ghameda (In mysterious circumstances) (2015)
 Alarrab (The Godfather) (2015)
 Al Ekhwa (The Brothers) (2015)
 Alf laylat walayla (A Thousand and One Nights) (2015)
 Al Tawarid (The Expelled) (2016)
 Shouq (Longing) (2017)
 Aloqab wa Alafra''' (The Eagle and Al Afra) (2017)
Teen Wolf (2013 - 2016)
 Shababeek (Windows) (2017)
 Maqamat El-Ishq (Love stations) (2019)
 Khatam alnamr (Tiger seal) (2020)
 Alwajh alakhar (The other face) (2020)

Films
 Nadi El-Regal El-Serri (The Secret Men Club) (2019)
 Amwal Amma (Public funds) (2020)

Discography

Albums
 El Helwa'' (2019)

Singles and Music videos

References

General references

External links
 Official website of Nesreen Tafesh (archived from May 2007, in Arabic)
 
 
 
 

1982 births
Living people
Syrian film actresses
People from Aleppo
Syrian television actresses
21st-century Syrian actresses
Syrian people of Palestinian descent
Syrian people of Algerian descent
Algerian people of Palestinian descent
Algerian people of Moroccan descent
People of Berber descent
Syrian actresses